Daari Tappida Maga is a 1975 Indian Kannada-language film produced and directed by Peketi Sivaram. The film stars Rajkumar, Kalpana, Aarathi, Manjula and Jayamala with K. S. Ashwath, M. V. Rajamma and Vajramuni in supporting roles and Thoogudeepa Srinivas in a cameo along with Rajkumar's second son Raghavendra in a small role in his second on screen appearance as a child artist after the 1974 movie Sri Srinivasa Kalyana. Rajkumar appeared in dual roles in the movie. The music was composed by G. K. Venkatesh. The movie was a Blockbuster and saw a theatrical run of over 175 days in multiple centres. The movie was re-released on 22 November 2019. The movie was dubbed in Malayalam in 1976 as Kollakkaran. It was later remade in Malayalam in 1980 as Manushya Mrugam starring Jayan.

Plot 
Prakash (alias Prashanth) and Prasad (Rajkumar in dual role) are born twins. One of the boys, Prakash, is lost somewhere in childhood. Prasad grows and is raised by his parents, but Prakash raised by a thief.

Prasad is a professor at a government college, living with his wife Pramila (Kalpana) and his mother. Prakash becomes a big thief and bandit. The bandit team consists of Prakash, Ashok (Vajramuni), Thoogudeep Shrinivas. They are stealing money and wealth in society and con people. Prakash befriends Radha (Aarthi) in the name of Prashant and lives with her for some days and cheats her.
Prakash steals diamonds with Ashok while disguised as CBI Officials and beliefs ACP, takes with his help. The police commissioner appointed CBI to investigate. Raju, Prasad friend and CBI Officer takes the case and starts to investigate. Prakash again steals with his team in disguise of a film team. Another time they steal in a home in the disguise of swamiji and cheated Princess (Jayamala).

CBI Raju takes information about all incidents and inquires Radha about Prakash. Prakash accidentally comes to Prasad's home, caught by Prasad and his mother and revealed to be lost child Prakash. He stays in their home. CBI Raju finds that Prakash is behind all incidents.

Radha meets Prasad and calls him Prashant and asks him why did you cheet me and CBI tries to catch him. Prasad tries to clarify himself to Radha. Prasad knows the entire truth about Prakash and goes to home and decides to punish him. Starts quarrel with him. His mother stopped them and knows about truth from Prasad, feels sad about Prakash. His mother said Prasad and Prakash are like two eyes to her. she don't lose anyone of them. Prakash changes his mind because of his mother's words and decides to go far somewhere. But Prasad confronts him. Ashok knows about Prakash from Radha and comes to take him with them but shocked to see look-alike.

Prakash calls him and decide to go with. Prasad tries to stop but Ashok beats him. Prakash starts to beat Ashok for beating his brother Prasad. A quarrel starts between them. CBI and Police comes there and kill Ashok, but Prakash tries to escape, police fires at him. Prakash is wounded and hides somewhere. Police shoot him when comes out from hiding. In the last scene, Prakash dies in front of Prasad and his family, CBI and Police.

Cast 

 Rajkumar as Prakash "Prashanth"/Prasad
 Kalpana as Pramila, Prasad's wife
 Aarathi as Radha Devi, Prashanth's love interest
 Manjula as Pushpa, Pramila's sister
 Jayamala as Princess of Bundelpur
 M. V. Rajamma as Prakash and Prasad's mother
 K. S. Ashwath as D. C. Raju, an officer with the CID
 Vajramuni as Prashanth's accomplice
 Rajashankar
 Sampath as Police Commissioner of Bangalore
 Balakrishna as Prasad's father-in-law
 Thoogudeepa Srinivas
 Raghavendra Rajkumar as Kitty (child artist)
 B. Jaya 
 Honnavalli Krishna 
 Shani Mahadevappa

Soundtrack 
The music was composed by G. K. Venkatesh.

References

External links
 
 

1975 films
1970s Kannada-language films
Indian drama films
Films scored by G. K. Venkatesh
Films directed by Peketi Sivaram
Kannada films remade in other languages
1975 drama films